Gladsaxe Stadium is a sports center located on Gladsaxevej 200, Søborg, Gladsaxe Municipality, in Copenhagen, which is primarily used for association football matches. The stadium hosts a number of  training courses for running the football, handball and softball and hosts a restaurant.
The ground is the home ground of Akademisk Boldklub and Gladsaxe-Hero Boldklub  (rail size: 68 x 105 meters, and lighting: 700 lux.).

The stadium has a capacity of 13,800, of which 8,000 are covered seats.

The construction of the plant was started in 1938 and named Gladsaxe Idrætspark Marielyst. The inauguration of the facility took place on 26 May 1940. Recent renovation was started on 16 November 1998 and included construction of one long side with both upper and lower grandstand and a sponsor lounge. The plant was subsequently inaugurated under its new name, Gladsaxe Stadium, 12 September 1999 [1] [2]. The opposite stand is from the 1960s and the two end stands are only standing room without a roof.
Plant spectator record was set on April 18, 2004 with 10,039 spectators in the Superliga match between Akademisk Boldklub and FC Copenhagen.

The ground hosts international rugby league in Denmark.

References

External links
Public service homepage

Football venues in Denmark
Buildings and structures in Copenhagen
Buildings and structures in Gladsaxe Municipality